The .45 Colt (11.43×33mmR), is a rimmed, straight-walled, handgun cartridge dating to 1872. It was originally a black-powder revolver round developed for the Colt Single Action Army revolver. This cartridge was adopted by the U.S. Army in 1873 and served as an official US military handgun cartridge for 14 years.

History

The .45 Colt was a joint development between Colt's Patent Firearms Manufacturing Company, of Hartford, Connecticut, and the Union Metallic Cartridge Company of Bridgeport, Conn. Colt began work on the revolver in 1871, and submitted a sample to the U.S. Army in late 1872. The revolver was accepted for purchase in 1873.

The cartridge is an inside lubricated type. The rebated heel type bullet design of its predecessor, the .44 Colt (.452–.454" diameter bullet), was eliminated, since it was an outside lubricated type, which would pick up dirt and grit during handling. The .45 Colt replaced the .50 caliber Model 1871 Remington single shot pistol and the various cap-and-ball revolvers converted to take metallic cartridges in use at the time. While the Colt remained popular, the Smith & Wesson M1875 Army Schofield Revolver was approved as an alternate, which created a logistical problem for the Army. The S&W revolver used the .45 S&W Schofield, a shorter cartridge, which would also work in the Colt, however the Army's S&W Schofield revolvers could not chamber the longer .45 Colt, so in 1874 Frankford Arsenal, then almost exclusive supplier of small arms ammunition to the U.S. Army, dropped production of the .45 Colt cartridge in favor of the .45 S&W round. This resolved the Army's ammunition logistics problems, but there were still plenty of the longer Colt-length cartridges in circulation once production ceased. The Benet primed .45 Revolver cartridges were subsequently replaced by the 'Model of 1882 Ball Cartridge for Cal. .45 Revolver' which used an external Boxer primer and could be reloaded at the unit level.  The .45 caliber M1882 cartridge would be officially replaced by the .38 Long Colt in 1892 but would remain in production until 1896. In 1901-1902 it would once again be loaded by Frankford Arsenal for use in the Philippines.

In 1909, the .45 M1909 round was issued along with the .45 Colt New Service revolver. This round was never loaded commercially, and is almost identical to the original .45 Colt round, except having a larger diameter rim (.540 in (13.7mm)). The rim is large enough that it cannot be loaded in adjacent chambers in the rod-ejector Colt model.

The .45 Colt remains popular with renewed interest in Cowboy Action Shooting. Additionally, the round has seen resurgence as a cartridge in handgun hunting and Metallic Silhouette Shooting competitions beginning in the 1950s with the introduction of stronger, heavier framed handguns. The cartridge's popularity has also increased with the increased marketing of handguns that can also fire the .410 bore shotgun shell, such as the Taurus Judge and the S&W Governor, though first seen decades earlier in the MIL Thunder 5. While the .45 Auto (AKA .45 ACP) uses .451 inches in diameter for jacketed bullets, and .452 for lead bullets, the .45 Colt still uses .452 inch diameter jacketed bullets and .454 diameter lead bullets, often adding to the confusion between the two cartridges with similar names as the .45ACP and Model 1911 pistols will often be called ".45 Colt" in common usage, leading many to call the .45 Colt the .45 "Long Colt" similar to how other Colt revolver cartridges were names (Like the .38 Long Colt). The .45 Colt became the basis for other rounds, such as the .454 Casull.

Cartridge loads
The .45 Colt originally was a black-powder cartridge, but modern loadings use smokeless powder. However, this load generated too much recoil for the average soldier and was, after a few years, reduced to only 28 grains of black powder yielding 855 ft/s in Army tests. Then the introduction of the S&W Schofield revolver with its shorter cylinder and quick loading "Top-Break" frame caused a problem for the Supply Corps in that they now had to supply two different types of .45 Caliber pistol ammunition. Further troubles were caused by the fact that the Schofield cartridge rim was too wide to load into adjacent chambers in the colt cylinder, turning the Colt into a three shooter, if the wrong ammunition was sent to that particular outpost. So, the Army came up with a short case narrow rim cartridge that only held 26 grains of black powder that could be used in both revolvers. That load gave about 760 Feet per Second with a 250-grain bullet out of the Schofield revolver with its shorter Barrel. Because of the power of the 40 grains of black powder and its excellent accuracy, the .45 Colt was known as a sure man stopper and horse killer. It became the most-used cartridge at the time of its introduction, succeeding the .44-40 Winchester.

The .45 Colt at that time did not enjoy the .44-40's advantage of a Winchester rifle chambered for it being available, thus allowing the use of the same cartridge in both a pistol and a rifle. According to rumor at the time, this was owing to early .45 Colt cartridges having a very narrow rim and causing ejection issues from a rifle chamber. Today, modern Winchesters, Marlins, and other replicas have remedied this omission almost 50 years after the fact, and the .45 Colt is now available in modern lever-action rifles.

While this aforementioned rumor has been one of the numerous arguments used to explain the lack of a rifle chambered in .45 Colt, it may have simply been a case of Colt refusing to authorize the use of their patented .45 Colt cartridge in other manufacturers’ arms. Only after the expiration of Colt‘s original patents for the .45 Colt did it become available in a rifle. This, however, does not explain the absence of a .45 Colt chambering (or indeed any of Colt's own cartridges) in the Colt-Burgess lever-action or Colt Lightning slide-action rifles. Thus lending more credence to the rumored basic problem with Colt's revolver cartridges when used in rifles. (The modern .45 Colt cartridge rim is still narrow, but features an extractor groove cut into the base of the case, a feature common to most modern cartridges but not at all common in the late 19th century.)

High pressure ammunition
Some handloads and factory-manufactured cartridges put this round in the same class as the .44 Magnum, using specially made revolvers. These loads cannot be used in any original Colt Single Action Army or replica thereof, such as those produced by Uberti, Beretta, the Taurus Gaucho, or the Ruger New Vaquero, as these guns are built on the smaller frame with thinner cylinder walls. These loads should be used only in modern large-frame revolvers such as the Ruger Blackhawk, Ruger Redhawk, and the original large frame Ruger Vaquero (sometimes referred to as the "Old Model" to differentiate it from the small frame "New Vaquero.")

Thompson Center Contender "Magnum" .45 Colt loadings can also be safely fired from any gun chambered in either the .454 Casull or .460 S&W Magnum cartridges, though proper feeding may be an issue in repeating rifles chambered for either the .454 or .460 as the OAL is significantly shorter. Modern rifles with strong actions (such as the Winchester Model 1894, Marlin Model 1894, and new clones of the Winchester Model 1892) chambered for the cartridge can safely handle the heavier loadings.

Handloading
Colt .45 revolvers made until early WWII had barrels with .454" groove diameters. After this diameters of .451–.452" were produced. Using .454" diameter bullets in the smaller barrels will work but will generate higher pressures. Cases used with .454" bullets may have to be full-length resized to work in newer guns. Speer handloading guidance states that the loads they show should be used only in handguns made specifically for modern smokeless powder. The loads mentioned in No. 10 reloading manual state that they do not exceed 15,000 psi. This is the equivalent of +P loading as normal pressure for the .45 Colt is 14,000 psi.

In a section specifically titled "45 Colt for Ruger or Contender only" Speer makes reference to velocities up to 1300 feet per second with 200-grain bullets. They also state that pressures do not exceed 25,000 psi (CUP). This is well beyond a pressure that can destroy even modern guns chambered in .45 Colt with the exception of the large frame Ruger Blackhawk, Ruger Redhawk, Freedom Arms Models 83 and 97, and the Dan Wesson.

Uses
Colt began work on their 1873 Single Action Army Model in 1871. Sample cartridges submitted for Army tests were made by UMC, using the Benet cup primers; commercial ammunition used the Berdan-type primer, followed by the more common Boxer priming. Original UMC loads used a  powder charge and  bullet.

The .45 Colt cartridge remains in use  years after its introduction. It is used as a hunting load on animals the size of deer and black bear. Heavier handloads will take the same range of big game animals as the .44 Magnum. Several two-barrel derringers are sold that are chambered in .45 Colt, and some of these derringers can chamber a .410 bore shotgun shell without any modifications being required. Revolvers chambered in .410 shotgun, such as the Taurus Judge and the Smith & Wesson Governor, are usually chambered for the .45 Colt as well. A popular use for the .45 Colt today is in Cowboy Action Shooting, where the round is often fired from either original or replicas of the 1873 Colt Single-Action Army.

Winchester, Marlin Firearms, Henry Repeating Arms, Chiappa Firearms, Rossi, Uberti, Cimarron Firearms and other manufacturers produce lever-action rifles chambered in .45 Colt. Colt has resumed production of the Single-Action Army, and many SAA replicas and near-replicas as well as modern-design single-actions by Ruger are chambered for this cartridge.

Influence on other cartridges
The .45 Colt became the basis for the much more powerful .454 Casull cartridge, with the .454 Casull having a slightly longer case utilizing a small rifle primer in place of the large pistol primer. Any .454 Casull revolver will chamber and fire .45 Colt and .45 Schofield, but not the inverse due to the Casull's longer case. The .460 S&W Magnum is a longer version of the .454 Casull and the .45 Colt. Likewise, .460 Magnum revolvers can chamber and fire the three shorter cartridges, but again, not the reverse.

Gallery

See also
11 mm caliber
List of handgun cartridges
Table of handgun and rifle cartridges

References

External links
Article on the .45 Colt and the handloading therof
John Linebaugh discusses loading the .45 Colt 
Ballistics By The Inch .45 Colt results.

Weapons and ammunition introduced in 1873
45 Colt
45 Colt
Colt cartridges
Rimmed cartridges